The Mister is a 2019 romance novel by E. L. James.

Plot
English aristocrat Maxim Trevelyan inherits the Earldom of Trevethick after the sudden passing of his elder brother, Kit. He sleeps one time with his sister-in-law Caroline, who was his lover but had chosen his brother instead of him. He falls for his Albanian undocumented immigrant housemaid, Alessia Demachi. He finds out about her many talents and her past life. He takes her to his place in Cornwall when two unauthorised people came to his apartment searching for Alessia. He introduces Alessia to sexual pleasure and enjoys her company. At first she has no idea of Maxim's title but finds out and decides to run away. Maxim stops her and reveals his affections for her and they reconcile. Alessia reveals the truth about her abusive betrothed who kidnaps her when they are in England. Alarmed, Maxim confronts Caroline and goes after Alessia to Albania. Due to the absence of her documents and passport, she travels with her fiancée through another route. Maxim reaches her home and asks for her hand in marriage and Alessia enters soon after where she reveals the truth about her fiancée to her father and tries to get Maxim to be married to her. The novel ends with Alessia's father threatening Maxim to marry his daughter and them being together.

Reception
The Mister received mixed to negative reviews by literary critics, with review aggregator Book Marks reporting three negative and two positive reviews among 6 collected. The Guardian described it as "A coked-up lord bonks a trafficked Albanian immigrant as the Fifty Shades of Grey author swaps BDSM for dispiritingly creepy power games" and adding that "There is a complete dearth of emotional maturity that is genuinely unsettling." Jezebel wrote "the narrative is so committed to sexualizing Aleissa's vulnerability and powerlessness that the result is offensive." The Atlantic said it was "hopelessly retrograde and dismally unentertaining." In a positive review, Booklist stated that “the book’s belief in the infinitely transformative power of love will hit the sweet spot for readers looking to be swept away.”

It featured on the podcast series 372 Pages We'll Never Get Back, a podcast that discusses literature that the two men "are probably going to hate".

Film adaptation 
On February 25, 2020, it was announced by Variety that The Mister would be adapted into a film produced by Universal Pictures.

References

External links
Official site

2019 British novels
Vintage Books books
British romance novels
Novels set in Albania
Novels set in Cornwall
Novels set in London